Yako may refer to the following people:
Given name
Yako Chan, Taiwanese singer and actress

Surname
Daisuke Yako (born 1988), Japanese volleyball player
Dani Yako (born 1955), Argentinian photographer, journalist and architect
Madoda Yako (born 1989), South African rugby union player
St John Page Yako (1901-1977) Xhosa poet